Aegialeus was the fifth strategos (elected general) of the Achaean League in Ancient Greece who served for only a year, 242–241 BC.

Ancient Greek generals
3rd-century BC births
3rd-century BC deaths
Year of birth unknown
Year of death unknown
Achaean League